Miles James Storey (born 4 January 1994) is an English professional footballer who plays as a striker for National League North side Hereford.

Originally from the West Midlands, Storey began his professional career at Swindon Town. Although he did not become a main part of Swindon's set-up at the time, Storey was sent on loan to numerous clubs such as Portsmouth, Newport County and Inverness Caledonian Thistle. His goal-scoring form in the Scottish Premiership attracted more interest and in May 2016 Storey signed for Aberdeen, before moving to Partick Thistle in August 2017.

Career

Swindon Town
Storey was born in West Bromwich and started his football education with Wolverhampton Wanderers but was released and whilst playing for Sedgley Lions under 15s in Division 3 – was spotted by Mick Elliott MBE who was the head of recruitment at Coventry City. He signed for Coventry City but after one full season was not offered a scholarship and was released. Again without a club, Elliott took Storey to Swindon Town for a trial game where he impressed the coaches and was handed a two-year scholarship. During his first season as a scholar at Swindon, he impressed and helped Paul Bodin's youth side to win their third successive season.

After Swindon Town manager Paul Hart was dismissed as manager in April 2011, Bodin was installed as caretaker boss. Bodin brought Storey into the first team set-up for the club's home fixture against Oldham Athletic. He made his debut as a 78th minute substitute, replacing on-loan forward Calvin Andrew in a 0–2 loss.

On 30 October 2012, Storey scored twice against Premier League side Aston Villa in the League Cup, to level the score at 2–2, before Christian Benteke scored a late winner to send Aston Villa through 3–2.

On 6 May 2013, Storey missed a penalty in a shoot-out in the play-off semi-final against Brentford, as Swindon lost 5–4 on penalties, after the tie had finished 4–4 on aggregate. He was handed his first start on 10 August, and provided an assist for the game's winner against Stevenage.

On 5 October 2013, it was announced that Storey had joined Conference Premier side Salisbury City on a month's loan deal. He made his debut on the same day in a 2–1 win against Wrexham.

On 21 December, Storey returned to first team action for Swindon, and after coming off the bench in the 71st minute to replace Ryan Harley in a Football League One home clash against his former side Coventry City, he scored the winner 15 minutes later.

On 14 February 2014, Storey joined fellow League One side Shrewsbury Town in a one-month loan. On 10 July, he moved to League Two side Portsmouth, also in a temporary deal.

On 30 January 2015, Storey joined Newport County on an initial one-month loan. He made his debut for Newport on 31 January versus Shrewsbury Town as a second-half substitute. The loan was subsequently extended to the end of the 2014–15 season. He scored his first goal for Newport on 28 February 2015 in a 1–0 win against Burton Albion.

Inverness Caledonian Thistle (loan)
Storey joined Scottish Premiership club Inverness Caledonian Thistle during the 2015–16 summer transfer window on loan until January. He scored his first goal for the club on his debut against Heart of Midlothian in a 2–0 victory. In January 2016, his loan was extended until the end of the season.

Aberdeen
On 17 May 2016, Storey agreed to join Aberdeen when his contract with Swindon expired in the summer of 2016. He scored his first goal for Aberdeen on 20 August 2016, in a 2–1 win against Partick Thistle.

Partick Thistle
Storey moved to Partick Thistle for an undisclosed fee on 11 August 2017, signing a two-year contract. Storey scored his first goal for Partick thistle, scoring a 92nd-minute winner in a 2–1 home win over Dundee. In May 2018, it was apparent that his contract would not be renewed with the club. However, in July 2018, Alan Archibald extended Storey's contract with the Maryhill side with a revised one-year contract. Storey was released by the club in May 2019 after a disappointing season in the Championship.

Return to Inverness Caledonian Thistle
For the start of the 2019/20 season, Storey rejoined Inverness on a permanent contract. Storey netted his first goal back at the club in a 2–1 win against Arbroath. Storey spent the first stage of the 2020/21 season out injured but returned to the team in November 2020. Storey scored his first goal of the season in a 3–0 away win in the league, over Queen of The South.

Hereford
Storey signed for National League North side Hereford on 24 June 2021.

International career
On 13 November 2012, Storey made his England under-19 debut in a 1–0 win against Finland.

Career statistics

References

External links

1994 births
Living people
Sportspeople from West Bromwich
English footballers
England youth international footballers
Association football forwards
Swindon Town F.C. players
Salisbury City F.C. players
Shrewsbury Town F.C. players
Portsmouth F.C. players
Newport County A.F.C. players
English Football League players
National League (English football) players
Inverness Caledonian Thistle F.C. players
Aberdeen F.C. players
Scottish Professional Football League players
Partick Thistle F.C. players